Karol Fryzowicz (born 27 March 1991) is a Polish professional footballer who plays as a right-back for Górnik Polkowice.

Career

Club
He is trainee of Górnik Polkowice. In the summer 2010, he was loaned to Chrobry Głogów from Zagłębie Lubin.

Honours
Górnik Polkowice
II liga: 2020–21

References

External links
 

1991 births
People from Głogów
Sportspeople from Lower Silesian Voivodeship
Living people
Polish footballers
Association football midfielders
Zagłębie Lubin players
Chrobry Głogów players
MKS Kluczbork players
Górnik Polkowice players
Ekstraklasa players
I liga players
II liga players
III liga players